Lioptilodes altivolans is a species of moth in the genus Lioptilodes known from Peru. Moths of this species take flight in February and have a wingspan of approximately 18 millimetres. The specific name "altivolans" refers to the high altitude, 4,100 metres, at which the moths fly.

References

Platyptiliini
Moths described in 2006